Aleosteus eganensis is an extinct arthrodire placoderm fish. Its fossils have been found in the Late Emsian strate of the Sevy Dolomite Formation, in the Egan Range of east-central Nevada, USA. Almost complete fossils belong to juvenile and adult specimens and show a short and broad skull, posteriorly concave.

References 

Arthrodire genera
Placoderms of North America
Emsian life
Fossil taxa described in 2000
Fossils of Nevada